Paul Goldsmith (born October 2, 1925) is a former USAC and NASCAR driver.  He is an inductee of the Motorcycle Hall of Fame, the Motorsports Hall of Fame of America, and the USAC Hall of Fame.   Later in life Goldsmith became a pilot and, flying primarily a Cessna 421, transported engines and parts to and from races. Goldsmith is currently the oldest living veteran of the Indianapolis 500.

Motorcycle career 
Goldsmith was a famous A.M.A. Grand National Championship motorcycle racer during the late 1940s through the mid-1950s. His first victory came in 1952 aboard a Harley-Davidson at the Milwaukee Mile in Harley's hometown. Paul was a full-time worker at a Chrysler plant in Detroit.

His most famous victory was in the 1953 Daytona 200. Later in 1953, he won a  event at the grueling Langhorne (Pennsylvania) cinder track. He was awarded the Most Popular Rider of the Year Award for his efforts.

In 1954, Goldsmith had one victory at Charity Newsies at Columbus, Ohio, and four podium finishes. He finished second in the first year of the Grand National Series behind his former pupil Joe Leonard.

In 1955 he won his final AMA event at Schererville, Indiana. He was frequently running stock cars. He left motorcycle racing because he was pressured to run only stock cars by General Motors.

NASCAR and USAC stock car career
During the 1957 Southern 500 held on September 2 at Darlington Raceway, he sustained serious injuries when he was involved in a major crash which also seriously injured Fonty Flock and killed Bobby Myers. During lap 27, Flock was driving Herb Thomas's No. 92 Pontiac and spun on the backstretch, stopping perpendicular to the track. Myers and Goldsmith subsequently struck the stopped car at full speed respectively.

He was the winner of the final race at the famous Daytona Beach Road Course in 1958. He was also the only driver to win the Daytona Beach Road course both in a stock car and on a motorcycle.

Goldsmith was the 1961 USAC Stock Car champion, with 7 poles, 10 wins, 16 top-five finishes in 19 races. Goldsmith won his second consecutive USAC championship in 1962 with 6 poles, 8 wins, and 15 top-five finishes in 20 races.  He was inducted into the USAC Hall of Fame in 2018.

Championship Car career
Goldsmith competed in 8 races in the USAC Championship Car series, between 1958 and 1963 with 6 of those starts in the Indianapolis 500.  He finished in the top five twice at Indy, following up a 5th-place finish in 1959 with a 3rd in 1960.

Indianapolis 500 results

World Championship career summary
The Indianapolis 500 was part of the FIA World Championship from 1950 through 1960. Drivers competing at Indy during those years were credited with World Championship points and participation. Paul Goldsmith participated in three such World Championship races, finishing fifth in 1959 and third in 1960, earning him a total of six World Championship points.

References

External links 
Biography from Motorcycle Hall of Fame Museum  note: The Motorcycle HoF bio is incorrect; Paul never won the Daytona 500, but instead, won both automobile and motorcycle races on the beach/road course.
 

1925 births
American motorcycle racers
Indianapolis 500 drivers
Living people
NASCAR drivers
Sportspeople from Parkersburg, West Virginia
Racing drivers from West Virginia
USAC Stock Car drivers